Pinnacles (1983) is the sixth solo album by Tangerine Dream founder Edgar Froese. Pinnacles would be Froese's last solo album until Dalinetopia (2005). The album is named after The Pinnacles in the Australian Outback, which Froese had a deep admiration for.

Track listing
All compositions written, performed and produced by Edgar Froese.

References

External links

1983 albums
Edgar Froese albums
New-age albums